Valley Beth Shalom (informally called VBS) is a Conservative synagogue in Encino, Los Angeles, California. With approximately 1,500 member families it is one of the largest synagogues in Los Angeles and one of the largest Conservative synagogues in the United States. Newsweek includes it on its list of America's 25 Most Vibrant Congregations, saying "Valley Beth Shalom continues to be one of America's most relevant and community-minded synagogues."

Location
It is located at 15739 Ventura Boulevard in Encino, Los Angeles, California.

Philosophy and mission
Valley Beth Shalom is a synagogue community committed to the quest for a Jewish life that is Godly, meaningful, and purposeful.

Overview
The synagogue and its schools provide educational and learning opportunities for all ages.  Ranging from the College of Jewish Studies offering college level adult Jewish Learning, to weekly Shabbat morning Torah Study and Lunch and Learn lectures with Rabbi Ed Feinstein, VBS has something to offer for those adults wishing to learn more about themselves and their faith.  VBS offers educational programs for children ranging from birth to grade 12.  The Early Childhood Center focuses on nurturing children from birth to age 5. The Etz Chaim Learning Center provides supplemental Hebrew schooling for students looking to learn more about their religious heritage. The Valley Beth Shalom  Harold M. Schulweis Day School, a member of the Solomon Schechter Day School Association, is a full-time school providing educational opportunities for students grades K-6. OurSpaceLA provides Jewish experiences for children, teens and adults with special needs.  In addition to the schools, the VBS Youth Department (USY) provides educational, spiritual, religious and social opportunities and activities for its members and the community. VBS's chapter of United Synagogue Youth is a member of the Far West Region of USY, which is part of the Pacific Southwest Region of the United Synagogue of Conservative Judaism.

The clergy include Senior Rabbi Nolan Lebovitz, Rabbi Ed Feinstein, Rabbi Nina Bieber Feinstein, Cantor Herschel Fox, Cantor Phil Baron, and Cantor Jacqueline Rafii. Rabbi Harold M. Schulweis, arguably one of the most influential and renowned rabbis of his generation, was rabbi for many decades as well, serving in this capacity until his death in 2014.

The synagogue has launched a number of programs including the Jewish World Watch, an NGO founded by Rabbi Schulweis and Janice Kamenir-Reznik, and is a prominent founding member of the Havurah movement,.

On Yom Ha'atzmaut 2003 (6 May), a Molotov cocktail was thrown through one of the synagogue's stained-glass windows. Mayor James K. Hahn said, "These are acts of terrorism, they're acts of hatred, and they tear at the very fabric of our community."

References

External links

VBS Harold M. Schulweis Day School
Etz Chaim Hebrew School
Valley Beth Shalom USY
Schulweis Institute
Jewish World Watch

21st-century attacks on synagogues and Jewish communal organizations in the United States
Conservative Jewish day schools
Conservative synagogues in California
Encino, Los Angeles
Jewish day schools in California
Synagogues in Los Angeles